Cole Rouse (born July 8, 1997) is an American professional stock car racing driver. He last competed full-time in the NASCAR K&N Pro Series West and part-time in the K&N Pro Series East, driving the No. 99 Toyota Camry for Bill McAnally Racing in both series. He is from Fort Smith, Arkansas.

Racing career
Beginning in the mini-cup ranks, Rouse eventually progressed to late model racing.

Rouse's NASCAR career began in the K&N Pro Series West. He made his debut for Bob Bruncati's Sunrise Ford Racing in 2016. Rouse then left the K&N Pro Series West to compete for Kyle Busch Motorsports in the 2017 CARS Super Late Model Tour. He later joined Venturini Motorsports to compete in two ARCA Racing Series events at the end of the 2017 season.

Rouse returned to the K&N Pro Series West in 2018 to compete for Bill McAnally Racing. He also drove for the team in select K&N Pro Series East races, including the season-opener at New Smyrna Speedway, where he finished second behind Todd Gilliland.

On September 15, 2018, he made his NASCAR Xfinity Series debut, piloting the No. 78 for B. J. McLeod Motorsports. He finished an impressive 21st place after avoiding some of the carnage late in the going.

On October 13, 2018, Rouse took pole position and converted it into his first career K&N Pro Series win at All American Speedway.

Motorsports career results

Career summary

NASCAR
(key) (Bold – Pole position awarded by qualifying time. Italics – Pole position earned by points standings or practice time. * – Most laps led.)

Xfinity Series

K&N Pro Series East

K&N Pro Series West

ARCA Racing Series
(key) (Bold – Pole position awarded by qualifying time. Italics – Pole position earned by points standings or practice time. * – Most laps led.)

References

External links
 
 

Living people
1997 births
NASCAR drivers
Sportspeople from Fort Smith, Arkansas
ARCA Menards Series drivers
Racing drivers from Arkansas